Tentacular is a virtual reality game developed by Firepunchd Games and published by Devolver Digital. The game was released for Microsoft Windows via Meta Quest 2 and SteamVR on March 24, 2022, and released as a launch title for PlayStation VR2 on February 22, 2023.

Gameplay 
Tentacular is a physics-based adventure game where the player takes on the role of a gigantic but good-hearted tentacled beast in the waters of La Kalma, tasked with helping the islands citizens research a strange and powerful energy source.

There are 50 puzzle and action levels in which the player will need to use their tentacles to build large contraptions, structures, and taxi the citizens around La Kalma. The game also features a creative sandbox mode where the player has the freedom to explore and interact with the island.

Development 
Tentacular was officially announced via Twitter by Devolver Digital on February 11, 2022, with a release date of Q2 2022, with Firepunchd initially teasing the game in 2020.

Firepunchd, also known as Simon Cubasch is a game developer based in Berlin, Germany. He founded the digital agency "GoSub Communications" in 1998 which was acquired by Edelman in 2011. In his time with GoSub, Cubasch created over 20 games varying from 3D TV games, augmented reality applications, and mobile games.

References

External links 
 Official website

Video games developed in Germany
Meta Quest games